Because of low points received in 1993, Turkey was unable to participate in the Eurovision Song Contest 1994. Next year in Eurovision Song Contest 1995. Turkey was represented by Arzu Ece with the song "Sev" written by Zeynep Talu and composed by Melih Kibar.

Before Eurovision

18. Eurovision Şarkı Yarışması Türkiye Finali 
The final took place on 18 March 1995 at the TRT Studios in Ankara, hosted by Yesmin Ertugrul and Bülend Özveren. Ten songs competed and the winner was determined by an expert jury. 

Although the original singer of "Sev" was Yeşim Dönüş Işın, Arzu Ece took the place of Yeşim upon the warning of the jury.

At Eurovision
On the night of the contest Arzu Ece performed 10th in the running order following Spain and preceding Croatia. At the close of the voting the song had received 21 points placing Turkey 16th. 7 participants had voted for Sev. The Turkish jury awarded its 12 points to Norway.

Voting

References  

1995
Countries in the Eurovision Song Contest 1995
Eurovision